The 11th Air Refueling Squadron is an inactive United States Air Force unit. It was last assigned to the 340th Air Refueling Wing, stationed at Altus AFB, Oklahoma. It was inactivated on 1 October 1994.

History
During World War II the squadron trained crews and technicians for photographic reconnaissance and mapping, 1942–1944.

Reactivated in 1955 under Strategic Air Command (SAC) as a KC-97 air refueling squadron, it participated in SAC tests, exercises, and air refueling operations and other Air Force commands in North America, Europe, and the Pacific Far East, and Southeast Asia, from 1955 onward. It won numerous wards for its operational performance, including the Saunders Trophy for Outstanding Air Refueling Unit in 1970 and 1971.

It was upgraded in 1965 to the KC-135 Stratotanker jet. In 1972 the 11th supported two large-scale aircraft movements to Southeast Asia, 5–6 and 8–9 April, and on 12 May and over the next three days it deployed all available tankers and crews at Takhli RTAFB, Thailand. About one-half of squadron personnel formed a rear echelon at Altus AFB. The forward echelon manned the 4101st Air Refueling Squadron, Provisional. Some 11th ARS personnel were returning to Altus AFB on 4 November 1972, but some of the squadron remained on temporary duty in SEA. By January 1973 about half of the 11th's KC-135s had returned and by June 1973 all aircraft and crews had returned. The 11th continued its normal SEA support as well as its many other global commitments. The squadron refueled its first C-5 Galaxy on 1 May 1974.

The squadron's resources were divided on 1 July 1977, a part being retained by the 11th, the remainder used to man the new 340th Air Refueling Group, Heavy, and the 340th Consolidated Aircraft Maintenance Squadron. The new group was assigned to the 19th Air Division and the 11th to the group.

On 19 September 1985 the 11th Air Refueling Squadron was consolidated with the 11th Combat Mapping Squadron, a unit that was last active 1 May 1944. This action was directed by Department of the Air Force Letter DAF/MPM 662q Attachment 1 (Active Units), 19 September 1985. The Consolidated Unit will retain the Designation of 11th Air Refueling Squadron, Heavy.

The squadron was inactivated in 1994 as part of the drawdown of the USAF after the end of the Cold War.

Lineage
 Constituted as the 5th Mapping Squadron on 1 May 1942
 Activated on 7 May 1942
 Redesignated the  11th Photographic Mapping Squadron on 9 June 1942
 Redesignated the  11th Photographic Squadron (Heavy) on 6 February 1943
 Redesignated the 11th Combat Mapping Squadron on 11 August 1943
 Disbanded on 1 May 1944
 Reconstituted, and constituted (19 September 1985) with 11th Air Refueling Squadron, Heavy
 Constituted as the 11th Air Refueling Squadron, Heavy on 10 August 1955
 Activated on 1 December 1955
 Redesignated the 11th Air Refueling Squadron, Medium, on 15 September 1958
 Redesignated the 11th Air Refueling Squadron, Heavy, on 25 June 1965
 Redesignated the 11th Air Refueling Squadron on 1 September 1991
 Inactivated on 1 October 1994

Assignments
 2d Photographic (later Photographic and Mapping; Photographic Reconnaissance) Group, 7 May 1942 – 1 May 1944
 11th Bombardment Wing, 10 August 1955
 341st Bombardment Wing, 1 December 1955
 4050th Air Refueling Wing, 1 June 1960
 499th Air Refueling Wing, 1 January 1963
 820th Strategic Aerospace Division, 1 July 1964
 11th Strategic Aerospace Wing (later 11th Air Refueling Wing), 25 June 1965
 19th Air Division, 25 March 1969
 17th Strategic Aerospace Division, 2 July 1969
 47th Air Division, 31 March 1970
 19th Air Division, 30 June 1971
 340th Air Refueling Group (later Wing), 1 July 1977
 340th Operations Group, 1 September 1991
 97th Operations Group, 1 October 1992
 457th Operations Group, 1 July 1993 – 1 October 1994

Stations
 Bradley Field, Connecticut, 7 May 1942
 Colorado Springs Army Air Base, Colorado, 13 May 1942
 Will Rogers Field, Oklahoma, 14 October 1943 – 1 May 1944
 Abilene Air Force Base (later Dyess Air Force Base, Texas, 10 August 1955 – 1 June 1960
 Dover Air Force Base, Delaware, 1 June 1960 – 25 June 1965
 Altus Air Force Base, Oklahoma, 25 June 1965 – 1 October 1994

Aircraft
 Primarily B-17/F-9 Flying Fortress and B-24/F-7 Liberator, 1942–1943
 KC-97 Stratofreighter, 1956–1965
 KC-135 Stratotanker, 1965–1994

Decorations
Air Force Outstanding Unit Award 
1 Jul 1980 – 30 June 1982
1 Jul 1971 – 30 June 1973
1 Jan 1963 – 31 December 1974
1 Sep 1956 – 11 April 1957

See also

References

Notes

Bibliography

 
 

011
011
Military units and formations established in 1955
Military units and formations disestablished in 1994
1942 establishments in Connecticut